Jim McBride has recorded songs that he wrote individually and with the following co-writers: Roger Murrah, Keith Stegall, Charlie Monk, Wayland Holyfield, Stewart Harris, Charlie Craig, Brent Mason, Peter McCann, Guy Clark, Alan Jackson, Steve Dean, Gary Overton, Sam Hogin, Dan Truman, Joy Lynn White, Jerry Salley, Chapin Hartford, Don Cook, Greg Holland, Nelson Larkin, Ken Mellons, Carson Chamberlain, Trace Adkins, Phil Barnhart, Wally Wilson, Bill Anderson, Tammy Cochran, Buddy Jewell, Luke Bryan and Steve Norman.

All recordings 
Songs written by Jim McBride can be found on the following sites: AllMusic, Discogs, Genius, Music VF, Second Hand Songs, Songview, aka ACE (on ASCAP, which reports both ASCAP & BMI songs written by Jim McBride), Spirit Music Group, Wikipedia, Category: Songs written by Jim McBride, and YouTube Playlist. Print references used to help compile this list: the book "Hot Country Songs" by Joel Whitburn, 8th Edition, 1944–2012, and "Definitive Country: The Ultimate Encyclopedia of Country Music and Its Performers" by Barry McCloud and contributing writers.

1970s

1980s

1990"s

2000s

2010s

2020s

Unknown release date

Credits: television, film and YouTube

References

McBride, Jim